Christa Peters-Lidard is an American hydrologist known for her work on integrating land surface modeling and data assimilation, particularly with remotely sensed measurements of precipitation.

Early life 
Peters-Lidard grew up in Chesterfield County, Virginia where she was fascinated about nature, learned that she was good at math, and that she liked earth science. As an undergraduate at Virginia Tech she worked on a project on aquifers and groundwater flow at the United States Geological Survey and at that point she realized that she wanted to be an earth scientist at National Aeronautics and Space Agency (NASA).

Education and career 
Peters-Lidard has a B.S. in Geophysics from Virginia Tech (1991). Subsequently she earned an M.A. (1993) and a Ph.D. (1997) in Civil Engineering and Operations Research from Princeton University. From 1997 to 2001, Peters-Lidar was an assistant professor at Georgia Institute of Technology. Following this she joined the hydrological sciences branch of the National Aeronautics and Space Agency (NASA) at the Goddard Space Flight Center. In 2015, Peters-Lidar became the Deputy Director for Hydrosphere, Biosphere, and Geophysics works in the Earth Sciences Division at NASA Goddard Space Flight Center.

From 2011 to 2018 Peters-Lidar was the Chief Editor for the Journal of Hydrometeorology.

Research 

Peters-Lidard's graduate work linked rainfall measurements with data from airborne sensors detecting rainfall. She also established a mathematical framework to link land-atmosphere models with remotely-sensed rainfall data, and considered the role of heat being released from soils on modeling energy fluxes. While at Georgia Institute of Technology, she used balloons to make measurements of boundary layers in the atmosphere. Peters-Lidard has had one Ph.D student, Feifei Pan, who estimated the amount of water in soils based on rainfall levels, and examined algorithms used to characterize variability in a region's topography.

Peters-Lidard led the team that built a high performance computing cluster that became NASA's Land Information System software (LIS). LIS was the co-winner of NASA's 2005 software of the year award. LIS allows land surface modeling and data assimilation and, working with Sujay Kumar, Peters-Lidard used this system to quantify soil moisture assimilation.

Selected publications

Awards and honors 

 Arthur S. Flemming Award (2007)
NASA Outstanding Leadership Medal (2012)
Fellow, American Meteorological Society (2012)
 Fellow, American Geophysical Union (2018)

Reference section

External links 
 
 Peters-Lidard's NASA Mainiac lecture, November 28, 2018, available on NASA's Goddard Space Flight Center's YouTube channel 
NASA's Land Information System software (LIS)

1969 births
Living people
Fellows of the American Geophysical Union
Virginia Tech alumni
Princeton University School of Engineering and Applied Science alumni
Women hydrologists
NASA people